This list includes people who were born in or lived in Wrocław after 1945. For a list of notable residents before 1945, see List of people from Breslau.

 Jan Borysewicz - guitar player, composer, leader of the rock band Lady Pank
 Leszek Czarnecki - businessman and billionaire
 Artur Ekert - physicist
 Władysław Frasyniuk - politician
 Jolanta Fraszyńska, actress
 Robert Fudali - sole member of black metal band Graveland
 Waldemar Fydrych - alias "Major"; artist, founder of the Orange Alternative happening movement
 Eugeniusz Geppert - painter
 Kamil Giżycki - writer and traveler 
 Jerzy Grotowski - theatre director and theatrical avant-garde figure
 Mirosław Hermaszewski - cosmonaut
 Ludwik Hirszfeld - microbiologist, co-discover of the inheritance of the BO blood type
 Marek Hłasko - novelist, writer
 Hubert Hurkacz - tennis player
 Klaudia Jachira - politician and comedian
 Lech Janerka - singer, musician and composer
 Ewa Klonowski - forensic anthropologist
 Aleksandr Ivanovich Korolyov - vice-president of the Pridnestrovian Moldavian Republic
 Urszula Kozioł - poet
 Marek Krajewski - writer
 Wojciech Kurtyka - mountain climber
 Aleksandra Kurzak - opera singer
 Olaf Lubaszenko - actor and film director
 Jan Łopuszański - physicist
 Mata - rapper
 Mateusz Morawiecki - politician, Prime Minister of Poland
 Rafał Omelko - athlete
 Piotr Ponikowski - cardiologist
 Barbara Rogowska - comedian actress and comic
 Tadeusz Różewicz - poet and writer
 Wanda Rutkiewicz - mountaineer
 Selma Nicklass-Kempner - soprano
 Andrzej Sekuła - cinematographer and film director
 Hugo Steinhaus - mathematician
 Włodzimierz Trzebiatowski - chemist and physicist
 Michał Witkowski - writer
 Rafał Wojaczek - poet
 Dagmara Wozniak (born 1988) - Polish-American U.S. Olympic sabre fencer
 Maciej Żurowski - historian of French literature, translator, Romanist

 
Wrocław
Wrocław